Igor Djuric  (born 30 August 1988) is a Swiss professional footballer who plays as a defender for Swiss 1. Liga club Echallens.

Career
Djuric made a number of appearances for AC Bellinzona in the 2005–06 season of the Swiss Challenge League. On 3 February 2010, he returned to Bellinzona on loan after four years at Udinese.

On 16 June 2010, he left for SC Kriens on a one-year contract.

On 14 August 2015, he was given a 12-match suspension and a fine of CHF 8,000 by the Swiss Football Association, together with his Lugano teammate, Patrick Rossini, for paying prizes to players from Schaffhausen in the event of a draw or victory against Servette. On 17 September 2015, the court of appeals significantly reduced the sentence to a two-day suspension and a fine of CHF 5,000.

On 5 September 2016, Djuric signed a one-year contract with an option for an additional year with Neuchâtel Xamax. On 21 June 2019, he signed a contract extension until 2021 with Xamax.

International career
Djuric was born in Switzerland and is of Serbian descent. Djuric represented the Swiss under-19 team in the 2007 UEFA European Under-19 Football Championship qualifying round.

Honours
Lugano
Swiss Challenge League: 2014–15

Neuchâtel Xamax
Swiss Challenge League: 2017–18

References

External links
 football.ch
 

1988 births
People from Bellinzona
Sportspeople from Ticino
Swiss people of Serbian descent
Living people
Swiss men's footballers
Switzerland youth international footballers
Association football defenders
Udinese Calcio players
AC Bellinzona players
SC Kriens players
S.S. Arezzo players
FC Chiasso players
FC Lugano players
Neuchâtel Xamax FCS players
FC Echallens players
Swiss Challenge League players
Serie C players
Swiss Super League players
Swiss 1. Liga (football) players
Swiss expatriate footballers
Expatriate footballers in Italy
Swiss expatriate sportspeople in Italy